Thomas & Friends: Hero of the Rails is a 2009 British computer-animated adventure film and feature-length special of the British television series, Thomas & Friends. The film is produced by HIT Entertainment with animation from Nitrogen Studios. It introduces full CGI animation replacing live-action models, and the addition of a voice cast for the characters alongside the narration to the TV series.

The film features the voice of Ben Small and Martin Sherman as Thomas the Tank Engine for the UK and US respectively. It was first released on DVD and on iTunes on 12 January 2010. To promote the film a "Day Out with Thomas 2010: The Hero of the Rails Tour" was held at locations such as the Illinois Railway Museum, where guests could participate in activities such as arts and crafts or ride on a 15-ton replica of Thomas the Tank Engine.

A mobile app (Thomas & Friends: Hero of the Rails) was released in May 2011. The DVD was also released in 2019 in "The Heroic Collection" along with Misty Island Rescue, Day of the Diesels, Blue Mountain Mystery, and Tale of the Brave.

This special takes place in between the twelfth and thirteenth seasons of the television series.

Plot 
One summer on the Island of Sodor, Spencer arrives to help the Duke and Duchess of Boxford with the construction of their new summer house. After being an absolute nuisance to all of the other engines by teasing and bossing them around, Thomas accepts Spencer's challenge to a contest of strength, taking heavy cargo around the island. Thomas's brakes fail after climbing a tall hill, and he runs out of control through an overgrown, abandoned line. There, Thomas finds an old abandoned Japanese tender engine named Hiro, said to be one of Sodor's first engines. Hiro does not want Sir Topham Hatt to find out, fearing he will be scrapped, so Thomas promises to keep him his secret and work to make Hiro "Master of the Railway" once again. Later, he's taken to the Sodor Steamworks for repairs, where he finds old parts for Hiro. He takes them with permission from Victor (the Steamworks engine), only to discover that Hiro's hiding place is dangerously close to the Duke and Duchess's new summer house.

The following day, Thomas tells Percy about Hiro, and asks him to do his own job while he helps Hiro. Percy misplaces his own mail cars and breaks down while doing Thomas' job, so Thomas brings him to the Steamworks. Sir Topham Hatt finds out about this and scolds Thomas by forcing him to do Percy's work. With nobody else to ask for help, Thomas and Percy tell the rest of their friends (Gordon, James, Edward, Henry, Toby, and Emily) about Hiro. They all work together in bringing Hiro new parts, distracting Spencer, and keeping the operation secret from Sir Topham Hatt while Thomas and Percy try to find the missing mail cars. Hiro makes friends with all of the engines, but gradually grows homesick. On the day that the last necessary part for Hiro is to be delivered, Spencer discovers Percy's mail cars, only to be cornered by Thomas, James and Toby. Sir Topham Hatt accuses Spencer of stealing the trucks and demands he return them to Percy.

While Thomas and Hiro wait for Percy with the last part, they hear Spencer's whistle and run. Spencer finds them and gives chase, but without the last part, Hiro falls apart and is forced to a stop. Spencer is suddenly distracted by Gordon while Thomas moves Hiro to a new hiding place. The Duke and Duchess are furious with Spencer for abandoning his own work, and Thomas asks to assist him, in order to keep an eye on Spencer and to regain the trust of Sir Topham Hatt. Meanwhile, the other engines visit Hiro to keep his spirits up. When Thomas finally decides to tell Sir Topham Hatt about Hiro, Spencer tries to stop him, but he is foiled by a rickety bridge which collapses beneath him.

When Thomas explains Hiro's situation to Sir Topham Hatt, he reassures Thomas that he would never have scrapped the "Master of the Railway", and the following day, Thomas and Percy bring him to the Steamworks. There, Victor and his assistant (Kevin the Crane) work together to restore Hiro. Once he's as good as new, Hiro with Rocky the breakdown crane rescues Spencer, and they work with Thomas on the summerhouse. Spencer apologizes to the two engines, saying they are "both fine engines and fine friends." Hiro misses Japan, so Sir Topham Hatt arranges for Hiro to return home. A farewell party is held at the docks, and Thomas promises Hiro that Sodor will always be his home too.

Voice cast

Note: The first UK trailer uses different voices for Thomas and Spencer, as the footage used in the trailer was from the original version of the film, which would have featured Kerry Shale as the voice of Thomas and Spencer; his parts were recast for the released version. Toby's US voice is also heard in said trailer.

Song
A music video featuring an original pop rock song by Sam Blewitt singing "Go, Go Thomas!", was released on the DVD.

Media tie-ins
A mobile app (entitled Thomas & Friends: Hero of the Rails) was developed by Callaway Digital Arts and released on 13 May 2011. Kirkus Reviews rated the app positively, commenting that it "delivers the same predictable experience they relish in video and book form, gently augmented with interactive enhancements."

A video game adaptation of the film was also released to the Nintendo Wii and the DS in Europe on 29 June 2010. It was to be released in North America, but it has appeared to be cancelled indefinitely.

The movie was adapted into a Little Golden Book by the same name, which released on 11 May 2010.

Reception
DVD Talk gave a mixed review for Hero of the Rails, stating that it could be worth a rental while overall criticizing the film's plot, modernizations, and stating that it "[felt] like a poorly-thought-out extension of the series, designed simply to introduce a new format and score some cash." Common Sense Media gave the film three stars, as they felt that it would not disappoint fans of the series but that it was also your "typical Thomas tale". About.com gave the movie four stars, opining that while the film looked better than they expected and praised the film for the value lessons it imparted, it was also "unremarkable compared to every other Thomas CGI animated children's movie".

References

External links

 
 Hit Entertainment page
 Treehouse page

2009 computer-animated films
Thomas & Friends
Films set in Cumbria
Films set on islands
American computer-animated films
American children's animated adventure films
American children's animated comedy films
British computer-animated films
British children's animated films
Children's comedy-drama films
2009 direct-to-video films
Films directed by Greg Tiernan
2000s American animated films
Animated films based on animated series
Lionsgate animated films
Mattel Creations films
Animated films about trains
2000s English-language films
British direct-to-video films
American direct-to-video films
Lionsgate films
British children's comedy films
British children's adventure films
2000s adventure comedy films
British adventure comedy films
American adventure comedy films